The 2020 Wimbledon Championships was a cancelled Grand Slam tennis tournament scheduled to be played at the All England Lawn Tennis and Croquet Club in Wimbledon, London, United Kingdom, between Monday 29 June 2020 and Sunday 12 July 2020. It was never played because of the COVID-19 pandemic. The cancellation of the tournament was announced on 1 April 2020. This was the first time since World War II that the Wimbledon Championships have been cancelled.

Cancellation and impact of the COVID-19 pandemic
The All England Club exercised an insurance plan covering infectious diseases, reportedly claiming over £100 million for the cancellation. £10m was distributed to the 620 players whose rankings would have been high enough for them to enter the tournament had it taken place.

It was the first time the tournament had been cancelled since 1945 during World War II. Had it gone ahead, it would have been the 134th edition of the Wimbledon Championships.
 
Novak Djokovic of Serbia and Simona Halep of Romania were the defending champions in the 2019 men's and women's singles draw.

Following the cancellation, BBC, the host broadcaster of this event since 1937 decided to air classic games as a replacement programme.

Rescheduling of the tournament

The 134th edition of the Wimbledon Tennis Championships was rescheduled in 2021 instead, which took place from Monday 28 June 2021 to Sunday 11 July 2021 and in the end, Djokovic retained the gentlemen's singles title, while Ashleigh Barty of Australia won the ladies' singles in the rescheduled tournament.

References

External links
 

 

 

2020 ATP Tour
2020 in English sport
2020 in tennis
2020 sports events in London
2020 WTA Tour
July 2020 sports events in the United Kingdom
June 2020 sports events in the United Kingdom
Tennis events cancelled due to the COVID-19 pandemic